Garmarud-e Sofla (also Romanized as Garmārūd-e Soflá; also known as Garmārūd-e Pā'īn and Garmārūd) is a village in Moallem Kalayeh Rural District, Rudbar-e Alamut District, Qazvin County, Qazvin Province, Iran. At the 2006 census, its population was 184, in 71 families.

References 

Populated places in Qazvin County